"L'hymne" is a French-language song recorded by Canadian singer Celine Dion and Fred Pellerin, released on 19 August 2015 as the lead single from the Quebec animated film, La guerre des tuques 3D (2015). The English-language solo version by Dion, "Hymn", was released as the lead single from the English-language version of the film, Snowtime!, on 5 February 2016.

Background and release
In August 2015, it was revealed that Dion and Pellerin had recorded "L'hymne" for the soundtrack to the animated film Snowtime! (La guerre des tuques 3D), a re-imagination of the 1984 film The Dog Who Stopped the War (La Guerre des tuques). The full soundtrack featuring French and English songs and the film score, arrived in stores in Canada on 30 October 2015. The soundtrack also includes Dion's solo English-language version titled "Hymn".

Chart performance
In late October 2015, "L'hymne" debuted on the Canadian Adult Contemporary chart. It peaked at number forty-two in late November and left the chart in December 2015, after six weeks on it.

Music video
The music video for "L'hymne," directed by Scott Lochmus and Robert Yates, premiered on 14 September 2015 and features scenes from the film and also Dion and Pellerin recording the song.

Charts

English-language version
The French-language La guerre des tuques 3D film was released in Quebec on 13 November 2015, and the English-language version, titled Snowtime!, was released in the rest of Canada and the United States in February 2016. The English-language version of "L'hymne" (French-language duet between Dion and Pellerin), titled "Hymn," features Dion vocals only. The soundtrack to Snowtime! was released digitally on 12 February 2016 and on CD on 19 February 2016. "Hymn" was chosen as the first single and the music video to this version premiered on 5 February 2016. In the United Kingdom, the film was titled Cleo.

Release history

References

External links

2015 singles
2015 songs
Celine Dion songs
French-language songs
Male–female vocal duets